Puppetmastaz is a German hip hop group founded in Berlin with members from Germany, United States and Canada, like Max Turner, Chilly Gonzales, Paul PM (aka Mister Maloke), Mocky and Alex Tiller, who left the band in 2003. Formed in 1996, the group perform their shows with hand puppets and meet music styles of rap, funk and electronica.

The producers on at least 3 albums were N1tro, Patric Catani (aka Candie Hank, Ec8or) and Bomb 20. Bandleader Paul Affeld, along with Artist Max Turner, is the only member to have contributed to all 5 albums to date.  Former members are  also musician and songwriter Adam Traynor and Blake Worrell. Other recent Members: Pilo (Adrian Ilea), Zhi MC (Zhi Yang Trieu) and Luis Nassowitz.

Development
Their first transregional known songs were "Pet Sound" (2003, New Noise Label) and "The Bigger the Better" (2005, Louisville Records). The band members of the Puppetmastaz Crew are always seen as puppets on stage. Whilst music is played by their DJ, the band members rap live by their puppets.

The band's frontman is Mr. Maloke, a mole rapper whose characteristic sign is wearing a glitter topper, played by Paul PM aka Paul Affeld, who is also the heartbeat of that puppet-universe. According "to the legend" he founded the Puppetmastaz in the late 1990s. Step by step the band became bigger by puppets from all over the world. The puppets which later worked with the actual Puppetmastaz acted as first ones on shows in 1996 at Berlin's dance club Ex-Kreuz-Club.

The first shows as a hip hop act were organized in 1999, where also their first music video was made and titled with "Wick-a-Woo". On TV the puppet band were first seen in 2000. Their first maxi EP Humans Get All The Credits was released in 2002 and let grown the band's profile nationwide.

In 2003 were produced the maxi EP Pet Sound and Zoology as the album Creature Funk.
It followed a remix vinyl which was published as Prosettis Disco Balls but only as a limited vinyl edition. In October 2005 were released the EP Bigger the Better and the album Creature Shock Radio.

The Puppetmastaz's shows were regional as also trans regional known as "first toy group". Especially in France, where their live shows got 5000 visitors they became well known and got a big and constantly growing fan community.

In 2007 the Puppetmastaz published a cover of John Lennon's "Give Peace a Chance" in support of Amnesty International what had warmed even Yoko Ono's heart how the Puppetmastaz said in an interview.

Their latest album The Takeover (CD and double vinyl) was released in 2008.

They also started in June 2009 their own satire magazine with its title Puppetry Fair - The Glossy Gossip Gazette.

In 2009, the Puppetmastaz were touring in Germany, Spain, France, Austria, Japan and Belgium on their own shows as on festivals like Pukkelpop in Belgium and Sonnenrot Festival in Eching, Munich.

They toured China in October 2010, the first hip hop puppet crew to do so since the Chinese opening and reform.

All current band members

 Mr. Maloke: band leader, mole puppet
 Tango Troublemaker: producer, rapper, blue bird puppet
 Panic,the Pig: rapper, pig puppet
 Snuggles the Bunny: rapper, rabbit puppet
 Wizard The Lizard: rapper, lizard puppet
 Ducci Prosetti: rapper/Producer, dragon puppet
 HipHopNotist: rapper, gecko puppet
 Frogga: rapper, frog puppet
 Ricardo Prosetti: rapper/Producer, frog puppet
 Flix: rapper, bat puppet
 Turbid the Toad: frog puppet
 Ryno: rapper, rhino puppet
 Croucholina: toad puppet, dancer
 Croucho: toad puppet and brother of Croucholina
 Pit: Rapper, frog puppet
 Dino Prosetti: producer, fish puppet
 E-Wizz: Rapper, humanly puppet
 Midi Mighty Moe: DJ, fly puppet
 Big Eye: alien puppet
 Rita: reggae puppet
 Keil Pittler: demagogue puppet
 Bloke: clown puppet
 Lisa
 Buddha
 Richelieux
 Hammerhead Rapper, Shark puppet
 Dogga Dacoda
 Harold
 BumbleBee
 Squidrick A.K.A. Squidone: Rapper, octopus with hat
 Yobo: rapper and entertainer, twin brother of Star Wars' Yoda
 Peppino
 Orango-Thang

Discography

Keep Yo Animal! - 2016/2017 (CD / Verycords)
Revolve and Step Up! - 2012 (CD / Discograph)
The Break Up - 2009
The Takeover - 2008 (CD / double Vinyl - Discograph)
Clones - Live in Berlin - 2007 (CD / DVD (Vicious Circle / Louisville Records)
Creature Shock Radio - 2006 (CD Vicious Circle / Louisville Records)
Creature Funk - 2003 (CD [Labels / EMI)
Zoology - 2003 (EP (Labels / EMI)
Pet Sound - 2002 (EP [Labels / EMI)

References

External links
 The Official Puppetmastaz Website
 Puppetmastaz on Myspace
 Puppetry Fair - The Glossy Gossip Gazette
 Puppetry Fair - The Glossy Gossip Gazette on myspace
 video interview

German hip hop groups
Puppets